Fonters-du-Razès is a commune in the Aude department in southern France.

Population

See also
Communes of the Aude department
List of medieval bridges in France

References

Communes of Aude
Aude communes articles needing translation from French Wikipedia